The Duluth All-City Golf Tournament was conceived in 1941 as a demanding contest to determine annually the city golf champion of Duluth, Minnesota. To that end, tournament sponsors Duluth News-Tribune and Duluth Herald established a season-ending golf tournament of the best 32 golfers representing the city’s two public (Enger Park Golf Course and Lester Park Golf Course) and three private (Northland Country Club, Ridgeview Country Club and Riverside Golf Club) golf courses.

The field of 32 players was determined by 36-hole medal play intramural tournaments conducted at each golf course - some doubling as club championships. Ridgeview and Northland both qualified six players for the tournament, Enger Park and Lester Park seven each and Riverside four. Golfers unattached to any of the Duluth golf courses could compete for two at-large spots (Riverside closed in 1943 and its four entries were divided among Enger Park and Lester Park). Having qualified for the tournament, the participants played 18-hole match play elimination rounds with the two finalists playing a 36-hole match. Each year, the tournament rotated among the Duluth courses.

The first All-City champion was 28 year-old Jim Koehler of Enger Park who defeated fellow club member Wally Johnson 2 and 1 in a rain and wind-swept 36-hole match. Medal scores were excellent considering the conditions with Koehler shooting 73-78 (151) and Johnson 76-75 (151) over the par 72 Northland County Club layout.  The championship golf trophy - a large silver loving cup to be displayed at the home club of the champion - was presented to Koehler.  Koehler would repeat as winner in 1944 and 1953.

The Duluth All-City Golf Tournament quickly became one of the most prestigious golf events and a major among local and regional tournaments. Sponsorship by the two Duluth newspapers assured lavish print promotion and detailed coverage of the event. The mayor of Duluth added to the trappings of pomp and ceremony by officiated the drawing of pairings during the early years of the tournament.

Over the years, the structure of the tournament evolved.  By 1943, the Northland and Ridgeview clubs determined their entries by selecting their lowest handicap players - a change adopted by Enger Park and Lester Park a few years later. A junior event was added in 1944. A substantial change occurred in 1955 when the tournament moved to 72-hole medal play. Under this format, a 36-hole cut eliminated all but eight players with a 54-hole cut further reducing the field to four players for the final 18 holes. A year later, the tournament was reduced to 36-holes all played on a single day to lessen the burden on the host course which had to close access to members or to the public to conduct the tournament.

Because of the competitive nature of the tournament, the All-City produced champions that also succeeded in competitions at both state and national levels.  Among the junior champions, Bob Magie III and Gary Burton would subsequently win the Minnesota Golf Association’s State Amateur Championship. At the senior level, John Jenswold was a two-time NCAA National Golf Tournament runner-up and 1944 Big Ten Conference champion.  Tom Maas was the 1962 NAIA National Golf Tournament runner-up.  Bob Fretland became a PGA touring professional and Jim Nordine lost 1-up to Jack Nicklaus in the quarterfinals of the 1959 Trans-Mississippi Amateur – one month before claiming his second Duluth All-City title. Duluthian Leo Spooner - one of the most successful amateur golfers from northern Minnesota and a member of the Minnesota Golf Hall of Fame - did not win the All-City; one of the very few area tournaments for which he did not have at least one victory.

The last Duluth All-City Golf Tournament was played in 1963.  Prior to its demise, declining interest had caused some of the golf clubs to struggle filling their allocation of participants. Quotas were juggled among the clubs and at-large entrants became a larger percentage of the field. North Lakes Golf Association (NLGA) officials - who assumed promotion of the tournament from the Duluth News Tribune and Duluth Herald in 1954 - blamed the declining interest in the tournament on its timing. At its beginning in 1941, there were only a small number of golf tournaments available for area golfers. Over subsequent years, many other events such as the Reidar Lund Skyline Memorial Golf Tournament and Silver Bay Men's Invitational had been added to the summer tournament schedule so that by late September - when the All-City was conducted - players were no longer interested in tournament golf.

In early 1963, local golf officials decided to merge the Duluth City Public Links and the All-City golf tournaments into one large event to be known as the All-City Championship. At the time, the Public Links tournament was one of the oldest tournaments in Duluth having been conducted for 36 years. As with the All-City tournament, it had been one of the more popular events attracting most of the area's better golfers. However, it too had seen diminishing appeal in recent years. NLGA officials hoped that one big tournament would renew participant interest. The Public Links tournament was canceled as planned but the proposed All-City Championship didn't get off the ground because of other preoccupations by the NLGA. Consequently, the NLGA made a last-minute decision to play the All-City tournament for 1963 which was won by Rick Liljedahl. Jim Koehler, winner of the very first All-City tournament 22 years earlier, tied for second.

Having received a one-year reprieve, city golf pros and North Lakes Golf Association officials decided to end the All-City tournament in 1964 when it was concluded that they would have to increase the number of at-large entrants to more than six which no longer made it an "All-City" crown. Along with the discontinuance of the Duluth City Public Links Tournament the year before, two of the four local "Grand Slam" tournaments were no longer contested and a significant chapter in the history of competitive golf in Duluth was ended.

Winners

* Won in a playoff

Notes

References

Golf in Minnesota
All-City Golf Tournament
1941 establishments in Minnesota
1964 disestablishments in Minnesota
Recurring sporting events established in 1941
Recurring sporting events disestablished in 1964